Anita Mehta (born Calcutta) is an Indian physicist and Leverhulme Visiting Professor at the University of Oxford.

Life
After her B.Sc. in Physics from Presidency College, Calcutta, Mehta went to Oxford as the second Indian woman Rhodes Scholar to St Catherine's College, Oxford University, graduating with an MA and a DPhil in Theoretical Physics. She then did postdoctoral work at IBM, following this with a Research Associateship under the mentorship of Professor Sir Sam Edwards, when she pioneered the field of granular physics at the Cavendish Laboratory, Cambridge. Mehta was elected India's first Radcliffe Fellow to Harvard in 2006 and in 2007, awarded the Fellowship of the American Physical Society.  Mehta has been a visiting professor at the  University of Rome, the University of Leipzig, the Institut de Physique Theorique, CEA Saclay and the Max Planck Institute for Mathematics in the Sciences among others. She has been an Academic Visitor of Somerville College, Oxford.

Works

Anita Mehta 
Anita Mehta Granular Matter: An Interdisciplinary Approach. 1994

References

Year of birth missing (living people)
Living people
Indian women physicists
20th-century Indian physicists
Indian Rhodes Scholars
Fellows of Somerville College, Oxford
Alumni of the University of Oxford
Academic staff of the University of Calcutta
Scientists from Kolkata
20th-century Indian women
Fellows of the American Physical Society